The 22nd Strategic Aerospace Division is an inactive United States Air Force unit. Its last assignment was with the Fifteenth Air Force, stationed at Walker Air Force Base, New Mexico. It was inactivated on 1 July 1965 due to budget constraints.

History
"The 22nd Wing replaced an operational training unit at Hunter Field, Georgia on 5 December 1942 and began supervising and coordinating various aspects of dive bomber training for subordinate groups. It moved to Florida in February 1943 and continued training until 15 August 1943. Reestablished in July 1959 and later redesignated 22nd Strategic Aerospace Division, it assured that assigned units were organized, manned, trained, and equipped to conduct aerial refueling operations and long-range strategic bombing using either nuclear weapons or conventional weapons. In addition, from 1962 to 1965 the division controlled Atlas ICBMs."

Lineage
 Established as the 22nd Bombardment Training Wing on 28 November 1942
 Activated on 5 December 1942
 Disestablished on 15 August 1943
 Reestablished and redesignated 22nd Air Division on 1 July 1959
 Activated on 15 July 1959
 Redesignated 22nd Strategic Aerospace Division on 1 July 1962
 Discontinued and inactivated on 1 July 1965

Assignments
 III Air Support Command, 5 December 1942
 III Fighter Command, 6 – 15 August 1943
 Second Air Force, 15 July 1959
 Fifteenth Air Force, 9 September 1960 – 1 July 1965

Components
Wings
 6th Strategic Aerospace Wing: 1 July 1963 – 1 July 1965
 310th Strategic Aerospace Wing: 1 July 1962 – 25 June 1965
 341st Strategic Missile Wing: 15 July 1961 – 1 July 1962
 461st Bombardment Wing: 1 February 1963 – 30 June 1964
 4045th Air Refueling Wing: 15 July 1959 – 9 September 1960
 4062nd Strategic Wing: 1 December 1960 – 20 February 1962
 4090th Air Refueling Wing: 15 July 1959 [ 1 July 1960
 4128th Strategic Wing: 1 July 1962 – 1 February 1963

Groups
 84th Bombardment Group: 5 December 1942 – 15 August 1943
 311th Bombardment Group: 5 December 1942 – c. July 1943
 312th Bombardment Group: 5 December 1942 – c. March 1943
 339th Bombardment Group: 5 December 1942 – 15 August 1943
 405th Bombardment Group: 1 March – 15 August 1943
 407th Bombardment Group: 7 April – 15 August 1943

Stations
 Hunter Field, Georgia, 5 December 1942
 Drew Field, Florida, 12 February – 15 August 1943
 Clinton County Air Force Base, Ohio, 15 July 1959
 Malmstrom Air Force Base, Montana, 9 September 1960
 Schilling Air Force Base, Kansas, 1 July 1962
 Walker Air Force Base, New Mexico, 1 July 1963 – 1 July 1965

Notes

References 

 
 

022
022
Military units and formations established in 1942